Marion O'Brien Donovan (October 15, 1917 – November 4, 1998) was an American inventor and entrepreneur.  She was one of the most prolific female inventors of her time, having received 20 patents in total for her inventions. Donovan was inducted into the National Inventors Hall of Fame in 2015. Her most notable innovation is the invention of a reusable, leak-proof waterproof diaper cover in 1946 after many iterations. This led to her invention of the disposable paper diaper, which was eventually commercialized by Victor Mills, the creator of Pampers. Donovan also invented additional practical solutions to problems around the home.

Early life and education
Donovan was born on October 15, 1917, in South Bend, Indiana. After her mother passed away when she was seven, Donovan was raised by her father, who ran the South Bend Lathe Works manufacturing plant with his identical twin brother. The two men invented a number of items, including the "South Bend lathe" for producing automobile gears and gun barrels. Donovan spent much of her time at the plant after school, and her father, as an engineer and innovator himself, encouraged her to be innovative from a young age. When she was in elementary school, she created a new kind of tooth cleaning powder with her father's help.

In 1939, Donovan received a bachelor of arts in English from Rosemont College in Pennsylvania. In 1958, she received a master's degree in architecture from Yale University, where she was one of three women in her graduating class.

After earning her B.A., Donovan worked for several years as an Assistant Beauty Editor at Vogue magazine in New York before resigning to start a family and move to Westport, Connecticut. Donovan was first married to leather importer James F. Donovan in 1942 and later to John F. Butler in 1981. She had three children.

Inventions
As a housewife, Donovan soon became familiar with the deficiencies of common diapers. Due to the cloth diapers' lack of water resistance, babies would constantly wet and soil not only their diapers, but also the bed sheets and clothing they lay in. Donovan experimented with cloth from her shower curtains to sew a reusable, leakproof, and breathable diaper cover with a pouch for an absorbent diaper insert. Existing rubber baby pants caused diaper rash, and the elastic pinched babies' skin. Her final design's nylon parachute cloth was breathable, eliminating diaper rash, and used metal and plastic snaps instead of elastic or sharp diaper pins. She called it the "Boater", as it "looked like a boat", or "because it helped babies 'stay afloat'". Because no manufacturers were interested in the "Boater", Donovan decided to manufacture it herself. It debuted at Saks Fifth Avenue in New York City, where it became an instant success. She received four patents for her invention in 1951, which she sold that year to the Keko Corporation for $1 million.

By this time, Donovan had begun further experimenting with disposable paper diapers. A major requirement was for the diaper to wick moisture away from the skin in order to prevent diaper rash, which she solved using a special sturdy, absorbent paper composition. This invention however faced greater difficulties in the market; every large American manufacturer declined it as unnecessary and impractical. While Donovan was never able to find the right manufacturer, largely due to sexism, she is credited with innovations that eventually led to the creation of disposable diapers which were introduced in the U.S. by Procter and Gamble in 1961, specifically inventor Victor Mills' Pampers.

Donovan was instilled with an inventive spirit from a young age. She invented numerous practical solutions to home problems, and even designed her own house. Amongst her several inventions are a 30-garment compact hanger (the "Big Hangup"), a soap dish that drains into the sink, and the "Zippity-Do", an elastic cord that connects over the shoulder to the zipper on the back of a dress. She also invented the DentaLoop, a circular flossing product that she again made and marketed herself.

Donovan died on November 4, 1998, due to heart disease, at the age of 81 at Lenox Hill Hospital in the Manhattan section of New York City.

Donovan was featured on the March 15, 2018, episode of "The Daily Show".

Honors and awards
Donovan was elected to the National Inventors Hall of Fame in 2015 and has a picture on the Hall of Fame wall.

See also
Victor Mills

References

1917 births
1998 deaths
Yale School of Architecture alumni
Rosemont College alumni
Diapers
Women inventors
20th-century American inventors